Mount Darry is a rural locality in the Toowoomba Region, Queensland, Australia. In the  Mount Darry had a population of 35 people.

Geography 
Brigalow Park is a neighbourhood slightly east of the centre of the locality.

The land use is a mix of crop growing and grazing on native vegetation.

History
Mount Darry Provisional School opened on 28 August 1899. On 1 January 1909 it became Mount Darry State School. In 1915 it was renamed Zahley State School and in 1925 it was renamed  Kilbirnie State School. It closed on 31 December 1961. It was located at 752 Goombungee Kilburnie Road.

Brigalow Park Provisional School opened on 17 October 1910. On 1 May 1912 it became Brigalow Park State School. It closed on 13 April 1962. It was located on Brigalow Park School Road.

In the  Mount Darry had a population of 35 people.

Economy 
There are a number of homesteads in the locality:

 Avalon
 Bottle Tree
 Glenmore
 Hilton
 Mt Darry
 Ridge Farm
 Woodspring

Education 
There are no schools in Mount Darry. The nearest primary schools are Kulpi State School in neighbouring Kulpi to the west and Haden State School in Haden to the east. For secondary education to Year 10 only, the nearest school is Quinalow State School in Quinalow to the north-west. For secondary education to Year 12, the nearest school is Oakey State High School in Oakey to the south.

References 

Toowoomba Region
Localities in Queensland